Cleveland Township is one of sixteen townships in Elkhart County, Indiana. As of the 2010 census, its population was 11,158.

History
Cleveland Township was established in 1835, and named after Cleveland, Ohio, perhaps due to that city's nickname - "The Forest City".

Geography
Boot Lake is in this township.

Cities and towns
 Elkhart (west quarter)

Adjacent townships
 Osolo Township (east)
 Concord Township (southeast)
 Baugo Township (south)
 Penn Township, St. Joseph County (southwest)
 Harris Township, St. Joseph County (west)

Major highways

Cemeteries
The township contains two cemeteries; Carlton Cemetery and California Road Cemetery.

Education
The township has the Cleveland Branch Library, a branch of the Elkhart Public Library.

References
 
 United States Census Bureau cartographic boundary files

External links
 Indiana Township Association
 United Township Association of Indiana

Townships in Elkhart County, Indiana
Townships in Indiana